John Ernest Townrow (28 March 1901 – 11 April 1969) was an English professional footballer who played as a centre-half for Clapton Orient, Chelsea and Bristol Rovers in the Football League and for the England national football team.

Townrow was born in West Ham, now part of London, and attended Pelly Memorial School in the borough. He won two caps for England's schoolboy team, one of which came against Wales in 1915.

He began his professional football career at the end of the First World War with Second Division club Clapton Orient. He remained with the club until 1927, and played 253 league games for them. In April 1925 he won the first of his two international caps for England, in a 2–0 defeat to Scotland at Hampden Park. Townrow is one of only two men capped by England at senior level while an Orient player, the other being Owen Williams.

He joined Second Division rivals Chelsea in 1927, and went on to play 140 games for the club in all competitions and contribute to their promotion to the First Division in the 1929–30 season. His playing career finished with one season at Bristol Rovers in the Third Division South, where he played alongside his younger brother Frank.

Townrow was manager of Harrogate Town for a spell in the 1960s.

Honours
Chelsea
Football League Second Division runners-up: 1929–30

References

1901 births
1969 deaths
Footballers from West Ham
English footballers
Association football defenders
England international footballers
Leyton Orient F.C. players
Chelsea F.C. players
Bristol Rovers F.C. players
English football managers
English Football League players
Harrogate Town A.F.C. managers